The INAS 311 is an Indian naval air squadron based at INS Dega, Visakhapatnam.

History 
INAS 311 was commissioned on 24 March 2009 by the, then, Flag Officer Commanding-in-Chief, Eastern Naval Command, Vice Admiral Nirmal Verma, ADC. Cdr Sanjay Nandal was the commissioning commanding officer of the squadron. The squadron is based at INS Dega, Visakhapatnam, and operates the Dornier 228 aircraft.

References 

Aircraft squadrons of the Indian Navy
Naval units and formations of India